Baturraden (also spelled Baturaden) is a district in the Banyumas Regency on the slope of Mount Slamet, Central Java, Indonesia. It features panoramic views, waterfalls,  a mini-train, paddleboats, a water slide, and a pool. Its name is derived from a legend about star-crossed lovers, a manservant (Batur) and noblewoman (Raden).

Location
Administratively it is part of Rempoah Village, in the Baturraden District.

Minibuses, which let passengers off in the Baturraden district terminal, are also available from the city.

Etymology
The name Baturraden is derived from the Javanese words Batur ("manservant") and Raden ("nobleman/noblewoman"). According to local legend, the young daughter of a local king fell in love with a young man who worked in the stables. As their feelings were mutual, the two furtively had a relationship before ultimately eloping, without their parents' blessings. Shortly after their first child was born, the noblewoman's father marched on their home with his army and demanded that she return home. When she refused, the king had the stableman stabbed with a kris. The noblewoman, in despair, took the kris from her husband's body and killed herself. The king, before leaving, had their child killed as well, and all were buried in the area.

History
A simple suspension bridge in Baturraden collapsed in 2006 during the Eid al-Fitr holidays, killing nine and injuring dozens more. The accident was attributed to too much weight being on the bridge. A replacement bridge, made of concrete, was installed that year.

Between 1994 and 2009, Baturraden averaged 10,000 tourists annually. Tekad Santoso of the Association of the Baturraden Tourism Community attributed this low number to a lack of development and marketing, thus meaning that the full potential of the natural tourism was not reached. Efforts were made to increase the number of visitors, and the area saw a 300 percent increase in tourists over the Christmas holidays of 2009. By 2014, an average of 3,000 visitors came every weekend. Many of the tourists who go to Baturraden are from the nearby cities of Purwokerto, Tegal, Pekalongan, Semarang, and Yogyakarta.

Facilities

Baturraden is predominantly marketed for ecotourism. It offers views of Mount Slamet and the city of Purwokerto below. On-site is the Gumawang Waterfall, which measures  in height; it is common for local young people to jump from the top into the pool below, asking for money in exchange for the display. Near Baturraden are the hot spring of Pancuran Tujuh ( to the west) and the pool of Telaga Sunyi ( to the east); the former is accessible by foot from within the resort. Another hot spring, Pancuran Tiga, is located close to the resort and likewise accessible from within.

Baturraden has a variety of man-made attractions as well, including a mini-train, paddleboats, a water slide, and a pool. On-site there is a refurbished Fokker F28 Fellowship, purchased from Merpati Nusantara Airlines, which is used as a movie theater. Dubbed the "Theater Alam" (Nature Theater), it shows a variety of films about tourism. A statue of two nagas is found on the grounds, reflecting a local belief that two such creatures guard one of the natural pools. On certain days, cultural performances are held in Baturraden. These include the Grebeg Suro procession and the Kuda Lumping dance.

The area around Baturradden has numerous hotels, a total of 96 in 2013.

References

Works cited

External links

Tourist attractions in Central Java
Resorts in Indonesia
Banyumas Regency